Arthur James (born August 2, 1952) is former Major League Baseball outfielder who played for the Detroit Tigers in 1975.

External links

1952 births
Living people
Alacranes de Campeche players
American expatriate baseball players in Mexico
Baseball players from Detroit
Bristol Tigers players
Clinton Pilots players
Detroit Tigers players
Dorados de Chihuahua players
Evansville Triplets players
Indios de Ciudad Juárez (minor league) players
Iowa Oaks players
Knoxville Sox players
Major League Baseball outfielders
Montgomery Rebels players
Rochester Red Wings players